Jon Cypher (born January 13, 1932) is an American actor and singer. He is best known as playing Chief of Police Fletcher Daniels in Hill Street Blues throughout the series' run. He is also known for his work in Cinderella, As the World Turns, Major Dad, Probe, Law & Order, and Santa Barbara. He has also performed several times on Broadway, particularly in musical theatre.

Early life and education
Born in New York City, Cypher graduated from Erasmus Hall High School (1949) and Brooklyn College (1953). 

Cypher later received a master's degree in marriage and family counseling from the University of Vermont.

Career 
Cypher made his television debut as the Prince in the original 1957 production of Rodgers and Hammerstein's Cinderella opposite Julie Andrews in the title role. He is particularly remembered as Chief of Police Fletcher Daniels in Hill Street Blues, a role he played throughout the run of the series (1981–87). He played Commanding General Marcus Craig on Major Dad, alongside Gerald McRaney and Beverly Archer, and appeared as Howard Millhouse in the short-lived television series Probe. He played Dr. Alex Keith on As the World Turns (1977–79) and Dr. Arthur Donnelly on Santa Barbara (1988–89).

Other television credits include the recurring roles of Belson in The F.B.I., Dirk Maurier in Dynasty, Eric Brandon in Marcus Welby, M.D., and Jeff Munson in Knots Landing. He also provided the voice of comic villain Spellbinder in the animated television series Batman Beyond. 

Cypher made his first film appearance as the villain Frank Tanner in the 1971 Western Valdez Is Coming opposite Burt Lancaster and Susan Clark. He took on the role of the heroic Man-At-Arms in the 1987 film Masters of the Universe. He also starred in an episode of Barnaby Jones entitled "Dangerous Gambit" which originally aired on February 26, 1976. Cypher has since appeared periodically in films up through the late 1990s in mostly featured character parts.

Cypher had an active career on the stage in both musicals and plays. In 1956 he appeared at Denver's Elitch Theatre, as the leading man for the summer stock cast, where productions included The Rainmaker, Noël Coward's Tonight at 8.30, and The Chalk Garden. 

He made his Broadway debut as Wister LaSalle in the original 1959 production of Harvey Breit's The Disenchanted. He returned to Broadway in 1962 to replace Patrick O'Neal as the Reverend T. Lawrence Shannon in the original production of Tennessee Williams's The Night of the Iguana. He portrayed the role of Dr. Carrasco in the original 1965 cast of Man of La Mancha, later taking over the role of Don Quixote.

In 1967, he performed the role of Bert Jefferson in the original musical Sherry! by James Lipton and Laurence Rosenthal. His other Broadway credits include The Great White Hope, 1776, Coco, and Big: The Musical. 

Between 1990 and 1993 he appeared in 69 episodes in the CBS hit comedy TV show Major Dad, where he played Brigadier General Marcus C. Craig  

On July 20, 1992 Cypher suffered an injury during a dress rehearsal at the Benedum Center in Pittsburgh. He was preparing for an appearance as Fagin in the Civic Light Opera production of Oliver! when he fell down a darkened stairway at the theater, breaking his leg in two places and damaging cartilage and ligaments.  The incident left Cypher playing the character while seated in a wheelchair.  He sued the theater and a performance company in Pittsburgh for $20,000.   In a 2013 interview, Cypher revealed he still walked with a cane.

In a 2014 interview, he stated that poverty was the secret to his 47-year-long career.

Personal life 
Cypher was married to Ruth Wagner from 1965 to 1975. After they divorced, he married scientist Carol Rosin.

Credits

Film

Television

Theatre

References

External links

1932 births
American male film actors
American male television actors
American male voice actors
Male actors from New York City
Erasmus Hall High School alumni
Living people
People from Brooklyn
Brooklyn College alumni
University of Vermont alumni